Jock Corbett was an association football player who represented New Zealand, playing in New Zealand's first ever official international.

Corbett made his full All Whites debut in New Zealand's inaugural A-international fixture, beating Australia 3–1 on 17 June 1922 and ended his international playing career with six  A-international caps to his credit, his final cap an appearance in a 4–1 win over Australia on 30 June 1923.

References

External links
 

Year of birth missing
New Zealand association footballers
New Zealand international footballers
Year of death missing
Place of birth missing
Place of death missing
Association football midfielders